Michael Cooney (born 1967) is a British screenwriter, playwright, and director. Cooney also has written children's literature and young adult fiction. His most notable films are Identity (2003), The I Inside (2004) and Shelter (2010). His father is the actor and playwright Ray Cooney.

Personal life 
Cooney and the actress Jessica Collins married on May 4, 2016. He has one daughter with her, born in 2016, and two children from a previous marriage. He lives in Los Angeles.

Filmography

Plays

References

Further reading

External links 

1967 births
Living people
English film directors
English male screenwriters
British male writers
20th-century British dramatists and playwrights
21st-century British dramatists and playwrights